Hong Sok-jung, born in Seoul in 1941, is a North Korean writer.
He is the grandson of novelist Hong Myong-hui.

Sok-jung moved to North Korea with his family after the Second World War. He served in the Korean People's Navy, and obtained a degree in literature at Kim Il Sung University. His first published work was a short story, "Red Flower", in 1970. In 1979, he joined the Central Committee of North Korea's official literary organisation, the Joseon Writers' Alliance(Now under Korean Federation of Literature and Arts).

In 1993, he published his most successful work, Northeaster, an epic novel. In 2002, he published Hwang Jin-i, a historical novel set in the sixteenth century, which depicts courtesan Hwang Jin-i's discovery of the people's starvation and encounters with corrupt officials. Hwang Jin-i was awarded South Korea's Manhae Literary Prize in 2005 - the first time it had been awarded to a North Korean writer. An excerpt from the novel was translated into English and published by Words Without Borders (WWB) in Literature from the "Axis of Evil" in 2006.

See also

 North Korean literature

Sources
 Br. Anthony of Taizé, introductory remarks to the excerpt of Hwang Jin-i, in Literature from the "Axis of Evil" (a Words Without Borders anthology), 2006, pp.99–101.

1941 births
North Korean novelists
Living people
People from Seoul
Kim Il-sung University alumni